Ecclesia (Greek: ἐκκλησία ekklēsia) may refer to:

Organizations
 Ecclesia (ancient Greece) or Ekklēsia, the principal assembly of ancient Greece during its Golden Age
 Ecclesia (Sparta), the citizens' assembly of Sparta, often wrongly called apella
 The Greek and Latin term for the Christian Church as a whole
 Ekklesia (think tank), a British think tank examining the role of religion in public life
 Ecclesia College, a four-year Christian work college in Springdale, Arkansas
 Ekklesia Project, an ecumenical Christian network to promote a more active and God-centered faith
 Qahal or Ekklesia, a theocratic organisational structure in ancient Israelite society

Religion
 Ecclesia Dei, a statement or motu proprio issued by Pope John Paul II in 1988
 Ecclesiae Regimen, a reformation declaration against the Church in England of the Late Middle Ages
 Ecclesia and Synagoga, a pair of figures personifying the Roman Catholic Church and the Jewish synagogue found in medieval Christian art
 Church militant and church triumphant (ecclesia militans, ecclesia triumphans), Christians who are living on earth and those who are in heaven
 Mater Ecclesiae, a monastery inside Vatican City
 Mother Church (Latin Mater Ecclesiae), a reference to the Roman Catholic Church, or to other Christian churches or movements
 Nea Ekklesia, a church built by Byzantine Emperor Basil I the Macedonian in Constantinople between the years 876–80
 Christian Church, the whole Christian religious tradition throughout history
 Congregation is a large gathering of people, often for the purpose of worship. 
 In the sociological classifications of religious movements, a religion less pervasive in a society than a church but more so than a sect

Other uses
 Ekklesia, a 2008 album by For Today
 Castlevania: Order of Ecclesia, a 2008 Nintendo DS video game
 Mount Ecclesia, nature grounds in Oceanside, California with the international headquarters of The Rosicrucian Fellowship
 The bi-annual international convention and governing body of the Fraternity of Phi Gamma Delta
 The seventh song on Kamelot's album "Haven" is titled "Ecclesia"

See also
 Ecclesia Catholica (disambiguation)
 Ecclesiastes (disambiguation)
 Ad Universalis Ecclesiae, an 1862 papal constitution by Pope Pius IX dealing with the conditions for admission to Catholic religious orders
Advocatus Ecclesiae, lay persons of noble birth who defended a particular church or monastery during the Middle Ages
De triumphis ecclesiae, a Latin epic written c. 1250 by Johannes de Garlandia
Ecclesiam a Jesu Christo, a Papal constitution promulgated by Pius VII in 1821
Ecclesiam suam, a 1964 encyclical of Pope Paul VI on the Catholic Church
Ex Corde Ecclesiae, a 1990 apostolic constitution written by Pope John Paul II regarding Catholic colleges and universities
Extra Ecclesiam nulla salus, a Latin phrase meaning "Outside the Church there is no salvation"
Fasti Ecclesiae Scoticanae, a list of ministers from the Established Church of Scotland
Fabrica ecclesiae, a Roman Catholic Latin term for the funds necessary for the construction of a church
Lamentatio sanctae matris ecclesiae Constantinopolitanae, a motet by the Renaissance composer Guillaume Dufay
Libertas ecclesiae, emancipation from ecclesiastical authority, which guided the movement of Reform begun in the 11th century
Ordinarium Sanctae Romanae Ecclesiae, a document that established a voting procedure for  the papal conclave
Regimini militantis Ecclesiae, a papal bull promulgated by Pope Paul III in 1540 establishing the Jesuits
Universalis Ecclesiae, an 1850 bull of Pope Pius IX that recreated the Roman Catholic hierarchy in England
 

Christian terminology
New Testament Greek words and phrases
Latin words and phrases

es:Iglesia (desambiguación)